Odius may refer to:
 , character in Trojan War
 Odius (crustacean), a genus of amphipods in the family Odiidae
 Odius, a genus of harvestmen in the family Phalangiidae, synonym of Odiellus
 Odius, a genus of true bugs in the family Pentatomidae, synonym of Caystrus